The Region of the 10 Thousanders is a region in the Swabian Jura in the German state of Baden-Württemberg, the name of which alludes to the high mountain peaks in the area.

Almost all the highest mountains of the Swabian Jura (each over ), including their highest summit, are located in this relatively small region which only covers 20 km² around Deilingen, Wehingen and Gosheim in the southwestern Jura.

The name "Region of the 10 Thousanders" goes back to an action group that was initiated by various restaurants and municipalities of the Heuberg to promote regional tourism.

The 10 "thousanders" are – sorted by height in metres (m) above sea level (NHN):
 Lemberg, near Gosheim, höchster Berg der Schwäbischen Alb
 Oberhohenberg, near Schörzingen
 Hochberg, near Delkhofen
 Wandbühl, near Delkhofen
 Rainen, near Deilingen
 Montschenloch, near Delkhofen
 Bol, near Deilingen
 Hochwald, near Gosheim
 Hummelsberg, near Denkingen
 Kehlen, near Gosheim

The following form fairly unified high mountain chains which makes them difficult to identify for those not acquainted with the area:
 Lemberg, Hochberg, Oberhohenberg
 Hochwald, Kehlen, Hummelsberg
 Wandbühl, Montschenloch, Bol, Rainen

References

External links 

 Region der zehn Tausender (Heuberg Aktiv e. V.), at heuberg.de
 Die Region der 10 Tausender – overview map (Homepage Gymnasium Gosheim-Wehingen)

Lists of mountains
Tourism in Germany
Swabian Jura
 Tuttlingen (district)
Mountain and hill ranges of Baden-Württemberg